The Flaming Crisis is a 1924 American short silent Western film written and directed by William H. Grimes.

Plot
A young black newspaperman is convicted of murder on circumstantial evidence and sentenced to prison. He escapes and makes his way to the southwestern cattle country, where he falls in love with Tex Miller, a beautiful cowgirl. Having rid the territory of an outlaw band, he gives himself up to the law, thinking that he will be sent back to prison. After discovering that the real murderer has confessed, he returns to Tex and the country he has come to love.

Cast
 Calvin Nicholson as Newspaperman
 Dorothy Dunbar as Tex Miller
 Talford White
 Henry Dixon as Mark Lethler
 Kathryn Sherman
 Marie Chester
 Arther Yeargan
 William Butler

References

External links
 

1924 films
1924 Western (genre) films
1920s crime films
1920s romance films
American black-and-white films
American crime films
American romance films
Films directed by William H. Grimes
Silent American Western (genre) films
1920s American films
English-language romance films
1920s English-language films